Men's Slalom World Cup 1966/1967

Calendar

Final point standings
Points were only awarded for top ten finishes (see scoring system).

Men's Slalom Team Results

All points were shown including individual deduction. bold indicate highest score - italics indicate race wins

References
 fis-ski.com

Men's slalom
FIS Alpine Ski World Cup slalom men's discipline titles